CFAD-FM was a community radio station in Salmo, British Columbia.

Owned by Salmo FM Radio Society, the station was licensed on July 31, 2008. It began broadcasting on October 11, 2008 at 92.1 MHz.

The station was one of several new community radio stations launched in the Kootenay region in the 2000s. Others include CJLY-FM in Nelson, CHLI-FM in Rossland, CJHQ-FM in Nakusp and CIDO-FM in Creston. CFAD was a member of the National Campus and Community Radio Association.

On May 2, 2012, Salmo FM Radio Society received approval from the Canadian Radio-television and Telecommunications Commission (CRTC) to operate an English language FM community radio station to serve Salmo on the frequency of 91.1 MHz.

After 7 years broadcasting as a licensed community radio station, on January 3, 2017, the Salmo FM Radio Society turned off its transmitter and ceased broadcasting.

References

External links
Salmo Community Radio
 

Fad
Fad
Radio stations established in 2008
2008 establishments in British Columbia
2017 disestablishments in British Columbia
Radio stations disestablished in 2017
FAD
FAD-FM